{{Infobox radio station
| name               = KVOH
| logo               =
| city               = Rancho Simi, California
| area               = Los Angeles, Southern USA, Cuba
| branding           = Voice of Hope
| frequency          = 
| translator         = 
| repeater           = 1287 kHz (AM) in Israel, 6.065 Mhz in Africa
| airdate            = Reception reports go back to 1980; relaunch in 2011?
| last_airdate       = 
| format             = Religious
| language           = English, Spanish
| power              = 100 kW (source debatable)
| erp                = 50 kW
| haat               = 
| class              = None (Shortwave)
| facility_id        = 
| coordinates        = 
| callsign_meaning   = K (Western USA) Voice Of Hope| former_callsigns   = 
| former_frequencies = 
| affiliations       = 
| owner              = Rev. John and Heather Otis Tayloe 
| licensee           = Strategic Communications Group
| sister_stations    = Voice of Hope - Israel (1287 AM) and Voice of Hope - Zambia Africa (Shortwave)
| webcast            = 
| website            = http://www.voiceofhope.com 
}}KVOH''' The "Voice of Hope - Americas", owned and operated by Strategic Communications Group, is a non-commercial, 50 kW shortwave (SW) Christian/Gospel radio station located in Rancho Simi, California, though their studios are in Los Angeles, which they claim as their home city. Programming can be heard on 9.975 MHz and 17.775 MHz, often using two languages: English and Spanish.

Signal

The main KVOH signal is broadcast from their transmission facility on Chatsworth Peak in Southern California, with a signal of either 50 or 100  kilowatts of power; either signal claims to have a 100-degree lobe pointed at Cuba, which would also cover much of Mexico, the Caribbean, and the Southern United States.

KVOH's parent organization, Strategic Communications Group, maintains other signals on mediumwave and shortwave, with apparent Middle East reception on 1287 AM from Voice of Hope - Israel (AM), as well as from the Voice of Hope - Africa, broadcasting on two transmitters located in Zambia, Africa on 6.065 MHz. Despite this, parts of Northeast Africa do not receive a signal.

Programming
The schedule at KVOH consists of either religious speakers like Lorenzo Martinez (former musician based in Los Angeles), a daily devotional, or Christian music.  Also, Rev. John and Heather Tayloe's Nightwatch broadcast each evening.

History
The station website notes that it has broadcast programming on 9.975 Mhz for "over 30 years". The original station was founded by the late Dr. George Otis starting in 1985. KVOH was testing on 17.775 Mhz during August and September 2011.  Today, Rev. John and Heather Otis Tayloe, Strategic Communications Group, operate KVOH (Voice of Hope - Americas) in an effort to share the Gospel of Jesus by shortwave radio.

References

External links
 Station record from the Federal Communications Commission

Shortwave radio stations in the United States
International broadcasters
VOH